Kamke is a surname. Notable people with the surname include:

 Erich Kamke (1890–1961), German mathematician
 Tobias Kamke (born 1986), German tennis player